Rolando Mosqueira (born 30 September 1920) was a Chilean equestrian. He competed in two events at the 1952 Summer Olympics.

References

External links
  

1920 births
Possibly living people
Chilean male equestrians
Olympic equestrians of Chile
Equestrians at the 1952 Summer Olympics
Pan American Games medalists in equestrian
Pan American Games silver medalists for Chile
Equestrians at the 1951 Pan American Games
Place of birth missing (living people)
Medalists at the 1951 Pan American Games
20th-century Chilean people